Nesa (also Romanized as Nesā’; also known as Nesā’-e Pā‘īn and Nesā’ Pā‘īn) is a village in Nesa Rural District, Asara District, Karaj County, Alborz Province, Iran. At the 2006 census, its population was 857, in 204 families.

References 

Populated places in Karaj County